Hex, in comics, may refer to:

 Hex, a Marvel Comics character by the name of Dominic Destine, who is one of the ClanDestine
 Jonah Hex, who is also known as Hex in an alternate future

It may also refer to:

Hexon, a Wildstorm character and member of the Warguard, who appeared in Stormwatch
Hokum & Hex, a series from Marvel Comics' Razorline imprint created by Clive Barker
 Generation Hex, an Amalgam's comic book which also include the character Jono Hex
 Generation Hex, a team of mutants which appears in the comic book of the same name

See also
Hex (disambiguation)

References